This is a list of statistical regions of Serbia by Human Development Index as of 2021.

References 

Human Development Index
Ranked lists of country subdivisions